No Stylist may refer to:
 "No Stylist" (song), a song by Moroccan-American rapper French Montana (2018)
 No Stylist (album), an album by American rapper Destroy Lonely (2022)